Marvin P. Bryant (July 4, 1925 – October 16, 2000), also known as “Marv”, was an American microbiologist and bacteriologist, Professor in the Departments of Dairy Science and Microbiology at the University of Illinois, a member of the National Academies of Science, editor in chief of the American Society of Microbiology Publications.

Bryant was recognized as the most prominent rumen bacteriologist in the world for his seminal contributions in the fields of the ecology, physiology and metabolism of anaerobic rumen bacteria.
He was also elected an honorary member of the American Society for Microbiology, the highest honor awarded by the ASM.

The National Academies Press called him "the gentle giant of rumen microbiology".

Awards and Distinctions 
 the Superior Service Award of the U.S. Department of Agriculture, 1959
 the Borden Award of the American Dairy Science Association, 1978
 the Paul A. Funk Award of the University of Illinois, 1979
 Procter & Gamble Award in Applied and Environmental Microbiology, 1986 
 the Fisher Award of the American Society for Microbiology, 1986
 election to the National Academy of Sciences, 1987
 the Alumni Achievement Award of Washington State University, 1991
 the Bergey's Medal for Distinguished Achievement in Bacterial Taxonomy, 1996

Career and life 
Bryant was born in Boise, Idaho on July 4, 1925.

Bryant received a B.S. degree from Washington State University in 1949, M.S. degree in 1950 at the Professor R. E. Hungate’s laboratory,  and Ph.D. from University of Maryland in 1955.

References

External links
Arnold L. Demain and Ralph F. Wolfe, "Marvin P. Bryant", Biographical Memoirs of the National Academy of Sciences (2002)

1925 births
2000 deaths
American microbiologists
American bacteriologists
Members of the United States National Academy of Sciences
People from Boise, Idaho
University of Illinois faculty
Washington State University alumni
University of Maryland, College Park alumni